Prochoreutis alpina is a moth in the family Choreutidae. It was described by Yutaka Arita in 1976. It is found in Japan.

References

Arctiidae genus list at Butterflies and Moths of the World of the Natural History Museum

Prochoreutis
Moths described in 1976